Korup is a large village and northwestern suburb of Odense, in Funen, Denmark.

References

Suburbs of Odense
Populated places in Funen